Leonard Typpö (29 January 1868 – 27 June 1922) was a Finnish farmer and lay preacher, born in Rautio. He was a member of the Parliament of Finland from 1911 until his death in 1922, representing the Finnish Party from 1911 to 1918 and the National Coalition Party from 1918 to 1922.

References

1868 births
1922 deaths
People from Kalajoki
People from Oulu Province (Grand Duchy of Finland)
Finnish Lutherans
Finnish Party politicians
National Coalition Party politicians
Members of the Parliament of Finland (1911–13)
Members of the Parliament of Finland (1913–16)
Members of the Parliament of Finland (1916–17)
Members of the Parliament of Finland (1917–19)
Members of the Parliament of Finland (1919–22)
People of the Finnish Civil War (White side)